Golf is an optional sport at the Universiade that has been held on the event four times since the first inception in Bangkok 2007. Unlike the Olympic competition, a team competition is also held for both sexes.

Events

Medalists

Men's individual

Woman´s individual

Men's team

Woman's team

Medal table 
Last updated after the 2017 Summer Universiade

References

External links 
International Golf Federation

 
Universiade